The Grand Council is the parliament of the Swiss canton of Bern.

It consists of 160 members (as of 2006) elected by proportional representation for a four-year term of office. The French-speaking part of the canton, the Bernese Jura (districts of Courtelary, La Neuveville and Moutier) has 12 seats guaranteed, and 3 seats are guaranteed for the French-speaking minority of the bilingual district of Biel/Bienne.

Election
The council is re-elected every four years.  Like other legislatures in Switzerland, elections use party list proportional representation.  There are nine constituencies, based on the districts of the Canton.

Composition 
The last election was held in 2018.

References

External links 
All links are in German and French, unless otherwise noted.
 Official website of the Grand Council of Bern
 German-language Wikipedia article on the Grand Council of Bern
 Websites for the 2002 and 2006 Grand Council elections

Bern
Politics of the canton of Bern
Bern